John David Burns, born in Condon, Oregon, was a member of the Oregon State Senate from 1967 to 1975. He served as Senate President from 1971 to 1973.

Footnotes

Living people
Presidents of the Oregon State Senate
Oregon state senators
People from Condon, Oregon
1936 births